The Stokes parameters are a set of values that describe the polarization state of electromagnetic radiation. They were defined by George Gabriel Stokes in 1852,<ref>S. Chandrasekhar 'Radiative Transfer, Dover Publications, New York, 1960, page 25</ref> as a mathematically convenient alternative to the more common description of incoherent or partially polarized radiation in terms of its total intensity (I), (fractional) degree of polarization (p), and the shape parameters of the polarization ellipse. The effect of an optical system on the polarization of light can be determined by constructing the Stokes vector for the input light and applying Mueller calculus, to obtain the Stokes vector of the light leaving the system. The original Stokes paper was discovered independently by Francis Perrin in 1942 and by Subrahamanyan Chandrasekhar in 1947,Chandrasekhar, S. (1947). The transfer of radiation in stellar atmospheres. Bulletin of the American Mathematical Society, 53(7), 641-711. who named it as the Stokes parameters.

Definitions

The relationship of the Stokes parameters S0, S1, S2, S3 to intensity and polarization ellipse parameters is shown in the equations below and the figure on the right.

The factor of two before  represents the fact that any polarization ellipse is indistinguishable from one rotated by 180°, while the factor of two before  indicates that an ellipse is indistinguishable from one with the semi-axis lengths swapped accompanied by a 90° rotation. The phase information of the polarized light is not recorded in the Stokes parameters. The four Stokes parameters are sometimes denoted I, Q, U and V, respectively.

Given the Stokes parameters, one can solve for the spherical coordinates with the following equations:

Stokes vectors
The Stokes parameters are often combined into a vector, known as the Stokes vector:

The Stokes vector spans the space of unpolarized, partially polarized, and fully polarized light. For comparison, the Jones vector only spans the space of fully polarized light, but is more useful for problems involving coherent light. The four Stokes parameters are not a preferred coordinate system of the space, but rather were chosen because they can be easily measured or calculated.

Note that there is an ambiguous sign for the  component depending on the physical convention used. In practice, there are two separate conventions used, either defining the Stokes parameters when looking down the beam towards the source (opposite the direction of light propagation) or looking down the beam away from the source (coincident with the direction of light propagation).

Examples
Below are shown some Stokes vectors for common states of polarization of light.

{|
 |-
 |  || Linearly polarized (horizontal)
 |-
 |  || Linearly polarized (vertical)
 |-
 |  || Linearly polarized (+45°)
 |-
 |  || Linearly polarized (−45°)
 |-
 |  || Right-hand circularly polarized
 |-
 |  || Left-hand circularly polarized
 |-
 |  || Unpolarized
|}

Alternative explanation

The pair  is called a Jones vector. Alternatively, one may specify the propagation vector, the phase, and the polarization state, where  is the curve traced out by the electric field as a function of time in a fixed plane. The most familiar polarization states are linear and circular, which are degenerate cases of the most general state, an ellipse.

One way to describe polarization is by giving the semi-major and semi-minor axes of the polarization ellipse, its orientation, and the direction of rotation (See the above figure). The next figure shows examples of the Stokes parameters in degenerate states.

Definitions
The Stokes parameters are defined by

where the subscripts refer to three different bases of the space of Jones vectors: the standard Cartesian basis, a Cartesian basis rotated by 45°, and a circular basis. The circular basis is defined so that , .

The symbols ⟨⋅⟩ represent expectation values. The light can be viewed as a random variable taking values in the space C2 of Jones vectors . Any given measurement yields a specific wave (with a specific phase, polarization ellipse, and magnitude), but it keeps flickering and wobbling between different outcomes. The expectation values are various averages of these outcomes. Intense, but unpolarized light will have I > 0 but Q = U = V = 0, reflecting that no polarization type predominates. A convincing waveform is depicted at the article on coherence.

The opposite would be perfectly polarized light which, in addition, has a fixed, nonvarying amplitude—a pure sine curve. This is represented by a random variable with only a single possible value, say . In this case one may replace the brackets by absolute value bars, obtaining a well-defined quadratic map

from the Jones vectors to the corresponding Stokes vectors; more convenient forms are given below. The map takes its image in the cone defined by |I |2 = |Q |2 + |U |2 + |V |2, where the purity of the state satisfies p = 1 (see below).

The next figure shows how the signs of the Stokes parameters are determined by the helicity and the orientation of the semi-major axis of the polarization ellipse.

Representations in fixed bases
In a fixed basis, the Stokes parameters when using an increasing phase convention are

Properties
For purely monochromatic coherent radiation, it follows from the above equations that

whereas for the whole (non-coherent) beam radiation, the Stokes parameters are defined as averaged quantities, and the previous equation becomes an inequality:

However, we can define a total polarization intensity , so that

where  is the total polarization fraction.

Let us define the complex intensity of linear polarization to be

With these properties, the Stokes parameters may be thought of as constituting three generalized intensities:

Relation to the polarization ellipse
In terms of the parameters of the polarization ellipse, the Stokes parameters are

Inverting the previous equation gives

 Relationship to Hermitian operators and quantum mixed states 

From a geometric and algebraic point of view, the Stokes parameters stand in one-to-one correspondence with the closed, convex, 4-real-dimensional cone of nonnegative Hermitian operators on the Hilbert space C2. The parameter I serves as the trace of the operator, whereas the entries of the matrix of the operator are simple linear functions of the four parameters I, Q, U, V, serving as coefficients in a linear combination of the Stokes operators. The eigenvalues and eigenvectors of the operator can be calculated from the polarization ellipse  parameters I, p, ψ, χ.

The Stokes parameters with I set equal to 1 (i.e. the trace 1 operators) are in one-to-one correspondence with the closed unit 3-dimensional ball of mixed states (or density operators) of the quantum space C2, whose boundary is the Bloch sphere. The Jones vectors correspond to the underlying space C2, that is, the (unnormalized) pure states of the same system. Note that phase information is lost when passing from a pure state |φ⟩ to the corresponding mixed state |φ⟩⟨φ|, just as it is lost when passing from a Jones vector to the corresponding Stokes vector.

See also
 Mueller calculus
 Jones calculus
 Polarization (waves)
 Rayleigh Sky Model
 Stokes operators
 Polarization mixing

Notes

References
 E. Collett, Field Guide to Polarization, SPIE Field Guides vol. FG05, SPIE (2005). .
 E. Hecht, Optics'', 2nd ed., Addison-Wesley (1987). .
 
 

Polarization (waves)
Radiometry